i-wireless or i wireless may refer to:

 i-wireless, a mobile virtual network operator owned by Cincinnati-based Kroger and affiliated with Sprint
 i-wireless, a former prepaid mobile phone brand owned by Cincinnati Bell Wireless
 iWireless, a mobile network operator in Iowa, Wisconsin, and Illinois affiliated with T-Mobile
 iWireless Center, a multi-purpose arena in Moline, Illinois